Steve N. Mason (born 1957) is a Canadian historian of Judea in the Graeco-Roman period, best known for his studies of Josephus and early Christian writings. He was professor of classics, history and religious studies at York University in Toronto.
He has been Kirby Laing Chair of New Testament Exegesis at Aberdeen University (2011–2015?)  and works today at the University of Groningen, the Netherlands.

Works

Books

Edited by

Chapters

References

Living people
1957 births
Canadian biblical scholars
New Testament scholars
Academic staff of York University
Academics of the University of Aberdeen
Academic staff of the University of Groningen